Croatia participated in the 2014 FIFA World Cup. This was their fourth appearance having missed out on 2010.

Qualifying 

Croatia was in Group A of UEFA's World Cup qualifications. They played alongside Belgium, Serbia, Scotland, Wales and Macedonia. Croatia finished as runner-up in the group and entered the Second Round play-offs where the team beat Iceland and qualified for the 2014 FIFA World Cup.

Croatia national team was led by manager Igor Štimac until October 16, 2013 when he was, due to a series of bad results, replaced by Niko Kovač.

The complete results of the group stage

The final standings were the following:

Croatia qualified for the Second Round where they eliminated Iceland with a 2-0 aggregate score after a two-round play-off series.

Players 

Stipe Pletikosa and Mario Mandžukić are the only players that appeared in all 12 qualifying matches. Further more Pletikosa played the full 90 minutes of all the matches while Mandžukić was the top scorer with 4 achieved goal. Midfielder Marcelo Brozović and goalkeepers Danijel Subašić and Oliver Zelenika did not appear in any of the qualifying matches but made the final World Cup squad.

Complete list of players in the qualifying matches
{|class="wikitable sortable" style="text-align: center;"
|-
!width=50px|#
!class="unsortable" width=150px|Name
!width=50px|Games Played
!width=50px|Goals
|-
|rowspan="2"| 1
| Mario Mandžukić
| 12
| 4
|-
| Stipe Pletikosa
| 12
| 0
|-
| 3
| Darijo Srna
| 11
| 1
|-
|rowspan="2"| 4
| Ivan Perišić
| 10
| 1
|-
| Luka Modrić
| 10
| 0
|-
|rowspan="4"| 6
| Vedran Ćorluka
| 9
| 1
|-
| Ivan Rakitić
| 9
| 1
|-
! style="background-color: #ffdddd"   | Ivan Strinić
| 9
| 0
|-
! style="background-color: #ffdddd" | Josip Šimunić
| 9
| 0
|-
|rowspan="4"| 10
| Eduardo
| 7
| 2
|-
| Dejan Lovren
| 7
| 1
|-
| Ivica Olić
| 7
| 1
|-
| Ognjen Vukojević
| 7
| 0
|-
|rowspan="4"| 14
| Nikica Jelavić
| 6
| 1
|-
!  style="background-color: #ffdddd"  | Niko Kranjčar
| 6
| 1
|-
| Mateo Kovačić
| 6
| 0
|-
| Domagoj Vida
| 6
| 0
|-
| 18
!  style="background-color: #ffdddd"  | Nikola Kalinić
| 5
| 0
|-
| 19
| Gordon Schildenfeld
| 4
| 0
|-
|rowspan="2"| 20
| Milan Badelj
| 3
| 0
|-
| Sammir
| 3
| 0
|-
|rowspan="2"| 22
| Danijel Pranjić
| 2
| 0
|-
| Ante Rebić
| 2
| 0
|-
|rowspan="4"| 24
!   style="background-color: #ffdddd"  | Leon Benko
| 1
| 0
|-
!  style="background-color: #ffdddd" | Ivo Iličević
| 1
| 0
|-
!   style="background-color: #ffdddd"  | Josip Radošević
| 1
| 0
|-
| Šime Vrsaljko
| 1
| 0
|-

World Cup preparation 
The Croatian national team's World Cup camp was in luxurious Tivoli Ecoresort near Praia do Forte and Mata de São João in Bahia. The team played three friendly matches before the tournament.

Draw 
Croatia was drawn into Group A. Croatia's opponents in the first stage were Brazil, Cameroon and Mexico. The match between the Brazil and Croatia opened the World Cup tournament.

2014 World Cup squad 

Coach: Niko Kovač

The final squad was announced on 31 May 2014. With less than 48 hours until the opening game against Brazil, Milan Badelj was called up to replace the injured Ivan Močinić, after having previously been excluded from the final squad.

Team captain: Darijo Srna

Matches

Round Robin

Standings

Matches

Brazil vs Croatia

The two teams had met in two previous matches, including in the 2006 FIFA World Cup group stage, won by Brazil 1–0. Croatia forward Mario Mandžukić was suspended for the match, after being sent off in the team's final qualifier against Iceland.

Croatia opened the scoring through a Marcelo own goal, as the ball bounced off him into the net after Nikica Jelavić deflected Ivica Olić's cross. Neymar equalised for the hosts with a  shot after receiving a pass from Oscar. In the second half, Brazil took the lead with Neymar's penalty after Dejan Lovren was judged to have fouled Fred in the penalty area. Croatia had a potential equaliser disallowed, after a foul was called on the Brazilian goalkeeper, Júlio César. In added time, Oscar sealed the win, toe-poking the third goal for Brazil from  after receiving a pass from Ramires.

Post-match, FIFA referees chief Massimo Busacca defended the officials for awarding the penalty and insisted there had been some contact between Lovren and Fred, even if it was minimal. On the other hand, renowned former top-level FIFA referee Markus Merk criticised FIFA for having Yuichi Nishimura as the referee in the opening match, labelling the refereeing in the match as "embarrassing".

The game was notable for a number of pioneering events. This was the first occasion in FIFA World Cup history on which an own goal (which was also the first ever own goal scored by Brazil in World Cup finals) opened scoring in the tournament. As the first game played at this World Cup, the match also saw the first use of vanishing spray to mark free kick spots, and the advent of goal-line technology, two innovations introduced during the tournament.

Cameroon vs Croatia
The two teams had never met before.

In a match where both teams needed at least a point to stay alive in the competition, Croatia opened scoring when Ivica Olić scored from close range from Ivan Perišić's pass. Just before half time, Cameroon was reduced to ten men when Alex Song was dismissed for an off the ball incident with Mario Mandžukić. Perišić scored at the beginning of the second half when he intercepted Cameroonian goalkeeper Charles Itandje's goal kick and ran 50 yards before slotting in at the near post. Mandžukić scored the last two goals, the first a header from Danijel Pranjić's corner and the second a tap in after Itandje parried Eduardo's shot into his path. The result confirmed Cameroon's elimination from the tournament.

In a case of infighting, Cameroonian defender Benoît Assou-Ekotto was caught on camera head-butting teammate Benjamin Moukandjo. Song later apologised to Mandžukić and his country for his ejection, while Cameroonian coach Volker Finke said he was very disappointed with their performance.

On 1 July 2014, Cameroon officials announced that they had opened an investigation on claims that seven of the Cameroon's players were involved in fixing the result. FIFA, however, said there was no evidence that there were any match fixing in any of Cameroon's matches.

Olić, who previously scored a goal in the 2002 World Cup, became the second player to have a 12-year gap between World Cup goals, after Michael Laudrup in 1986 and 1998. Mandžukić became the first Croatian player to score a brace in a World Cup game. The 4–0 scoreline was also the biggest win by Croatia in the World Cup.

Croatia vs Mexico

The two teams had met in three previous matches, including in the 2002 FIFA World Cup group stage, won by Mexico 1–0.

Coming into the final round of matches, Croatia needed to win to guarantee qualification to the knockout stage regardless of the result of Cameroon vs Brazil, while Mexico only needed a draw to do so. The game was goalless for the first 70 minutes, until a Héctor Herrera corner to the back post allowed Rafael Márquez to score from a header, outleaping the Croatian defenders. With Croatia progressing only by way of a win, they were caught out on a break a short time later where Andrés Guardado scored after receiving a pass from Oribe Peralta. Mexico scored their third goal when Márquez flicked on Guardado's corner with substitute Javier Hernández scoring at the back post. Ivan Perišić scored in his second consecutive World Cup match after a neat back pass from Ivan Rakitić to get a consolation goal for Croatia in the closing minutes of the game, before Croatia's Ante Rebić was sent off for a foul on Carlos Peña. Mexico qualified as group runners-up (behind Brazil on goal difference) on virtue of the win, while Croatia were eliminated.

With his goal, Márquez joined Cuauhtémoc Blanco as the only Mexican player to score in three World Cups.

References

External links

 
Countries at the 2014 FIFA World Cup